Armin Schlieps (June 25, 1931 – December 14, 2005) was an archetier and luthier. He studied the craft with his father, George Schlieps.

Armin Schlieps was born on June 25, 1931, in  Wipuri, Finland. In 1950, the Schlieps family (George, Alma, Mira and Armin) immigrated to New York City, where George and his son Armin, both violinmakers, were invited to work for Rembert Wurlitzer as restorers. Soon after in 1952, they established their own shop in Carnegie Hall. He later moved to Seattle, where he ran a successful shop.

Armin Schlieps was trained in the Wurlitzer shop in New York City and became widely known for his repair work in the Seattle area from 1970 onward. He made instruments and over 200 bows as of 1986.
He died in 2005.

References

 
Drawings of Bows by Famous Bowmakers by Armin Schlieps (1985)
John H. Fairfield - Known Violin Makers
Loan Exhibition Stringed Instruments and Bows NYV 1966 (commemorating the 70th birthday of Simone Fernando Sacconi).

1931 births
2005 deaths
Bow makers
Finnish luthiers
Finnish emigrants to the United States